South Lake or Southlake may refer to:

Lakes

Canada
South Lake, Antigonish, Nova Scotia
South Lake, Halifax, Nova Scotia
South Lake, Hants, Nova Scotia
South Lake, Victoria, Nova Scotia

China
South Lake (Jiaxing), Jiaxing, Zhejiang
South Lake (Wuhan), Wuhan, Hubei

United States
South Lake (Inyo County, California), a lake featured in the film Baraka
South Lake (New York), in Herkimer County
South Lake (Hamilton County, New York)

Places
South Lake, Western Australia, a suburb of Perth, Australia
South Lake, Saskatchewan, a resort village in Canada
South Lake, Kern County, California, a community in Kern County, California, United States
South Lake, Pasadena, California, a neighborhood of Pasadena, California, United States
Southlake, Texas, a wealthy suburb of Fort Worth, Texas, United States

Other uses
Southlake Regional Health Centre, a hospital in Newmarket, Ontario, Canada

See also
Nanhu (disambiguation)
North-South Lake, a lake in New York state
South Lake Tahoe, California 
South Lakes, Alaska
Southern Lakes (disambiguation)